The 2022 Nicky Rackard Cup was the 18th staging of the Nicky Rackard Cup since its establishment by the Gaelic Athletic Association in 2005. The cup began on 10 April 2022 and ended on 21 May 2022.

Team changes

To Championship 
Relegated from the Christy Ring Cup

 Roscommon

Promoted from the Lory Meagher Cup

 Fermanagh

From Championship 
Promoted to the Christy Ring Cup

 Mayo

Relegated to the Lory Meagher Cup

 Leitrim

Competition Format

Cup format 
The 2022 Nicky Rackard is played on a Round-Robin basis. The counties who finish in the top two places shall qualify for the final, with the winner being promoted to the Christy Ring Cup. The bottom placed team in the Round Robin is relegated to the Lory Meagher Cup.

Group stage

Group stage table

Fixtures and results

Round 1

Round 2

Round 3

Round 4

Round 5

Knockout stage

Final

 Tyrone  are promoted to the 2023 Christy Ring Cup.

References

Nicky Rackard Cup